This is a list of French painters sorted alphabetically and by the century in which the painter was most active.

alphabetically

A–C

 Edmond Aman-Jean (1858–1936)
 Albert André (1869–1954)
 Mathuren Arthur Andrieu (1822–1896)
 Gaston Anglade (1854–1919)
 Charles Angrand (1854–1926)
 Alexandre Antigna (1817–1878)
 Arcabas (1926–2018)
 Renée Aspe (1922–1969)
 Louise Astoud-Trolley (1817–1883)
 Etienne Aubry (1746–1781)
 Louis-François Aubry (1770–1850)
 Joseph Aved (1702–1766)
 Jean Bardin (1732–1809)
 Rex Barrat (1914–1974)
 Georges Barrière (1881–1944)
 Cécile Bart (born 1958)
 Adrien Bas (1884–1925)
 Jean-François Batut (1828–1907)
 Jean René Bazaine (1904–2001)
 Frédéric Bazille (1841–1870)
 Geneviève Brossard de Beaulieu (fl. c. 1770–1815)
 Amar Ben Belgacem (1979–2010)
 Andrée Belle (1840–1901)
 Louis Émile Benassit (1833–1902)
 Marcelle Bergerol (1901–1989)
 Antoine Berjon (1754–1843) 
 André Beronneau (1886–1973)
 Louis Béroud (1852–1930)
 Jean-Baptiste Bertrand (1823–1887)
 Raymond Besse (1899–1969)
 Louis Bissinger (1899–1978)
 Pierre Bobot (1902-1974)
 Louis-Léopold Boilly (1761–1845)
 Jean-François Boisard (1762–1820)
 Maurice Boitel (1919–2007)
 Rosa Bonheur (1822–1899)
 Leon Bonnat (1833–1922)
 François Boucher (1703–1770)
 Henri Bouchet-Doumenq (1834-1884)
 Eugène Boudin (1824–1898)
 William Bouguereau (1825–1905)
 Gustave Boulanger (1824–1888)
 Charles Boulanger de Boisfremont (1773-1838)
 Valentin de Boulogne (1591–1632)
 Abel-Dominique Boyé (1864–1934)
 Louis Braquaval (1854–1919)
 Georges Braque (1882–1963)
 Ernest Breton (1812–1875)
 Pierre Brissaud (1885–1964)
 Pierre-Nicolas Brisset (1810–1890)
 François Brochet (1925–2001)
 Bernard Buffet (1928–1999)
 Étienne Buffet (1866–1948)
 Camille-Léopold Cabaillot-Lassalle (1839–1902)
 Louis-Nicolas Cabat (1812–1893)
 Gustave Caillebotte (1848–1894)
 Philippe Calandre (born 1964)
 Robert Campin (1378–1445)
 Albert-Ernest Carrier-Belleuse (1824–1887)
 Louis-Robert Carrier-Belleuse (1848–1913)
 Eugène Carrière (1849–1906)
 Clément Castelli (1870–1959)
 Paul Cézanne (1839–1906)
 Narcisse Chaillou (1835–1916)
 Charles-Michel-Ange Challe (1718–1778)
 Jean-Baptiste de Champaigne (1631–1681)
 Philippe de Champaigne (1602–1674)
 Jérôme-François Chantereau (1710?—?)
 Jean Chardin (1643–1713)
 Jean Siméon Chardin (1699–1779)
 José Charlet (1916–1993)
 Théodore Chassériau (1819–1856)
 Pierre Puvis de Chavannes (1824–1898)
 Wang Yan Cheng (born 1960)
 Jules Chéret (1839–1932)
 Aimée Julie Cheron (1821–c.1890)
 Antoine Chintreuil (1816–1873)
 Félix Auguste Clément (1826–1888)
 Charles-Louis Clérisseau (1721–1820)
 François Clouet (1515–1572)
 Jean Clouet (1480–1541)
 Léon Cogniet (1794–1880)
 Alphonse Colas (1818–1887)
 Émile Colinus (1884–1966)
 Nicolas Colombel (1646–1717)
 Charles-Fernand de Condamy (1855–1913)
 Lydia Corbett (born 1927)
 Roger de la Corbière (1893–1974)
 Frédéric Samuel Cordey (1854–1911)
 Karen Joubert Cordier (born 1954)
 Fernand Cormon (1845–1924)
 Jean-Baptiste-Camille Corot (1796–1875)
 Pierre Auguste Cot (1837–1883)
 Charles Cottet (1863–1925)
 Amédée Courbet (1827–1885)
 Gustave Courbet (1819–1877)
 Jean Cousin the Elder (1500–c. 1593)
 Jean Cousin the Younger (c. 1522–1595)
 Thomas Couture (1815–1879)
 Joseph Crepin (1875–1948)
 Eugene Emmanuel Amaury Duval (1808–1885)
 Théodore Basset de Jolimont (1787–1854)

D–G 

 Albert Dagnaux (1861–1933)
 Augustine Dallemagne (1821–1875)
 Charles-François Daubigny (1817–1878)
 Fernand Dauchot (1898–1982)
 Adrien Dauzats (1804–1868)
 Jacques-Louis David (1748–1825)
 Alexandre-Gabriel Decamps (1803–1860)
 Adolphe Déchenaud (1868–1926)
 Johan Stephan Decker (1784–1844)
 Edgar Degas (1834–1917)
 Alfred Dehodencq (1822–1882)
 Eugène Delacroix (1798–1863)
 Édouard Delaporte (1909–1983)
 Paul Delaroche (1797–1856)
 Jules-Élie Delaunay (1828–1891)
 Robert Delaunay (1885–1941)
 François-Alfred Delobbe (1835–1920)
 Marguerite Delorme (1876–1946)
 Maite Delteil (born 1933)
 Maurice Denis (1870–1943)
 André Derain (1880–1954)
 Jean-Baptiste-Henri Deshays (1729–1765)
 Henry d'Estienne (1872–1949)
 Édouard Detaille (1848–1912)
 Narcisse Virgilio Díaz (1807–1876)
 Étienne Dinet (1861–1929)
 Marcel Duchamp (1887–1968)
 Suzanne Duchamp (1889–1963)
 Joseph Ducreux (1735–1802)
 Georges Dufrénoy (1870–1943)
 Marie Duhem (1871–1918)
 Henri-Julien Dumont (1859–1921)
 Joseph Siffred Duplessis (1725–1802)
 François-Léonard Dupont-Watteau (1756–1824)
 Jules Dupré (1811–1899)
 Jean Dupuy (1925–2021)
 Pierre Ernou (1685–1739)
 Charles Eschard (1748–1810)
 Bracha L. Ettinger (born 1948)
 Henri Fantin-Latour (1836–1904)
 Auguste Feyen-Perrin (1826–1888)
 Clara Filleul (1822–1878)
 Hélène Feillet (1812–1889)
 Jean Fernand (born 1948)
 Charles Filiger (1863–1928)
 Rosalie Filleul (1752–1794)
 Jean-Hippolyte Flandrin (1809–1864)
 Camille Flers (1802–1868)
 René Fontayne (1891–1952)
 Jean Fouquet (1425–1481)
 Jean-Honoré Fragonard (1732–1806)
 Pierre Édouard Frère (1819–1886)
 Charles-Théodore Frère (1814–1886)
 Émile Friant (1863–1932)
 Eugène Fromentin (1820–1876)
 Pierre Gandon (1899–1990)
 Paul Gauguin (1848–1903)
 François Gérard (1770–1837)
 Théodore Géricault (1791–1824)
 Jean-Léon Gérôme (1824–1904)
 Félix-Henri Giacomotti (1828–1909)
 René Gillotin (1814–1861)
 Georges Gimel (1898–1962)
 Charles Léon Godeby (1866–1952)
 Alain Godon (born 1964)
 Eugène Goyet (1798–1857)
 Zoé Goyet (died 1869)
 Jean-Baptiste Goyet (1779–1854)
 Jean-Pierre Granger (1779–1840)
 Jean-Baptiste Greuze (1725–1805)
 Antoine-Jean Gros (1771–1835)
 Gabriel Guay (1848–1923)
 Anne Gueret (1760–1805)
 François Guiguet (1860–1937)
 Armand Guillaumin (1841–1927)
 Alvaro Guillot (1931–2010)

H–M 

 Ahmed Hajeri (born 1948)
 Fulchran-Jean Harriet  (1778–1805)
 T'ang Haywen (1927–1991)
 I.J. Berthe Hess (1925–1996)
 René Charles Edmond His (1877—1960)
 Anne Marguerite Hyde de Neuville (1771–1849)
 Jean Auguste Dominique Ingres (1780–1867)
 Étienne Jeaurat (1699–1789)
 Jeanne Jégou-Cadart
 Henri de Jordan (1944–1996)
 Jean Jouvenet (1644–1717)
 Victor Koulbak (born 1946)
 Georges Lacombe (1868–1916)
 Pierre Laffillé (1938–2011)
 Louis Lafitte (1770–1828)
 Antonio de La Gándara (1861–1917)
 Pierre Lamalattie (born 1956)
 Elisa de Lamartine (1790–1863)
 Espérance Langlois (1805–1864)
 Eustache-Hyacinthe Langlois (1777–1837)
 Jean-Charles Langlois (1789–1870)
 Polyclès Langlois (1813–1872)
 Langlois de Sézanne (1757–1845)
 François Lanzi (1916–1988)
 Edmond-Édouard Lapeyre (1880–1960)
 Gaston La Touche (1854–1913)
 Alfred Latour (1888–1964)
 Georges de La Tour (1593–1652)
 Joseph Latour (1806–1863)
 Jean-Paul Laurens (1838–1921)
 Jules Laurens (1825–1901)
 Andrée Lavieille (1887–1960)
 Eugène Lavieille (1820–1889)
 Marie Adrien Lavieille (1852–1911)
 Charles Lebayle (1856–1898)
 Charles Le Brun (1619–1690)
 Claude Lefebvre (1633–1675)
 Fernand Léger (1881–1955)
 Anne-Louise Le Jeuneux (died 1794) 
 Le Nain brothers (c. 1599–1677)
 Louis Le Nain (1593–1648)
 Charles-Amable Lenoir (1860–1926)
 Jean Paul Leon (born 1955)
 Eugène Lepoittevin (1806–1870)
 Xavier Leprince (1799–1826))
 Alfred Lesbros (1873–1940)
 Eustache Lesueur (1617–1655)
 Pierre Le Tellier (1614–1702)
 Louis Levacher (1934–1983)
 Jacques Linard (1597–1645)
 Fleury Linossier (born 1902)
 Louis-Anselme Longa (1809–1869)
 Inès Longevial (born 1990)
 Claudine Loquen (born 1965)
 Louis Michel van Loo (1707–1771)
 Évariste Vital Luminais (1821–1896)
 Richard Maguet (1896–1940)
 Aristide Maillol (1861–1944)
 André Maire (1898–1984)
 Jacques Majorelle (1886–1962) 
 Henri Malançon (1876–1960)
 Henri Malançon (1876–1960)
 Eugène de Malbos (1811–1858)
 Vincent Manago (1880–1936)
 Édouard Manet (1832–1883)
 Adrien Manglard (1695–1760)
 Pierre Marcel-Béronneau (1869–1937)
 Prosper Marilhat (1811–1847)
 Paul Marny (1829–1914)
 Henri Marret (1878–1964)
 Olivier Masmonteil (born 1973)
 François Mathieu (1962–2007)
 Henri Matisse (1869–1954)
 Théo Mercier (born 1984)
 Pierre-Charles Le Mettay (1726–1759)
 Pierre Mignard (1612–1695)
 Ksenia Milicevic (born 1942)
 Jean-François Millet (1814–1875)
 Maurice Moisset (1860–1946)
 Benoît-Hermogaste Molin (1810–1894)
 Alphonse Monchablon (1835–1907)
 Jan Monchablon (1854–1904)
 Claude Monet (1840–1926)
 Jules Monge (1855–1934)
 Nicolas-André Monsiau (1754–1837)
 Gustave Moreau (1826–1898)
 Berthe Morisot (1841–1895)
 Zareh Moskofian (1898–1987)
 Henri-Paul Motte (1846–1922)

N–R

 Louis Nattero (1870–1915)
 Louis Nattero (1870–1915)
 Alfred-Arthur Brunel de Neuville (1852–1941)
 Alphonse-Marie-Adolphe de Neuville (1836–1885)
 Virgilije Nevjestić (1935–2009)
 Joseph de La Nézière (1873–1944)
 Jean Nicolle (1610–c. 1650)
 Boris O'Klein (1893–1985)
 Jean-Baptiste Olive (1848–1936)
 Jean-Baptiste Oudry (1686–1755)
 Milena Palakarkina (born 1959)
 Gen Paul (1895–1975)
 Fernand Pelez (1843–1913)
 Jacques Pellegrin (1944–2021)
 Albert Joseph Pénot (1862–1930)
 Edmond Marie Petitjean (1844–1925)
 Hippolyte Petitjean (1854–1929)
 Alexis Peyrotte (1699–1769)
 Francis Picabia (1879–1953)
 François-Édouard Picot (1786–1868)
 Henri-Pierre Picou (1824–1895)
 Patrick Pietropoli (born 1953)
 Henri Pinta (1856–1944)
 Camille Pissarro (1830–1903)
 Claude Plessier (born 1946)
 Nicolas Poussin (1594–1665)
 Auguste Prévot-Valéri (1857–1830)
 André Prévot-Valéri (1890–1959)
 Pierre Puvis de Chavannes (1824–1898)
 Jean Puy (1876–1960)
 Denis Prieur (born 1957)
 Léon Printemps (1871–1945)
 Quentin de La Tour (1704–1788)
 Yehiel Rabinowitz (born 1939)
 Alexandre Rachmiel (1835–1918)
 Odilon Redon (1840-1916)
 Jean-Baptiste Regnault (1754–1829)
 Pierre-Auguste Renoir (1841–1919)
 Charles-Caïus Renoux (1795–1846)
 Eustache Restout (1655–1743)
 Jacques Restout (1650–1701)
 Marc Restout (1616–1684)
 Thomas Restout (1671–1754)
 Philippe Richard (born 1962)
 Raymond Rochette (1906–1993)
 Jeff Roland (born 1969)
 Bernard Rosenblum (1927–2007)
 Édouard Rosset-Granger (1853–1934)
 Georges Rouault (1871–1958)
 Jean Rouppert (1887–1979)
 Henri Rousseau (1844–1910)
 Théodore Rousseau (1812–1867)
 Monique de Roux (born 1946)
 Ferdinand Roybet (1840–1920)
 Henri Royer (1869–1938)

S–Z

 Fernande Sadler (1869–1949)
 Niki de Saint Phalle (1930–2002)
 Lucienne de Saint-Mart (1866–1953)
 Nicola Rosini Di Santi (born 1959)
 Maurice Savin (1894–1973)
 Jean-Jacques Scherrer (1855–1916)
 Franz Schrader (1844–1924)
 Théophile Schuler (1821–1878)
 René Schützenberger (1860–1916)
 Hippolyte Sebron (1801–1879)
 Jean Seignemartin (1848–1875)
 Henri Sert (1938–1964)
 Georges Seurat (1859–1891)
 Ibrahim Shahda (1929–1991)
 Paul Sibra (1889–1951)
 Sotiris René Sidiropoulos (born 1977)
 Paul Signac (1863–1935)
 Pierre Soulages (1919–2022)
 Nicolas de Staël (1914–1955)
 Jacques Stella (1596–1657)
 Michel Suret-Canale (born 1957)
 Alfred Swieykowski (1869–1953)
 Tancrède Synave (1870–1936)
 Octave Tassaert (1800–1874)
 Georges William Thornley (1857–1935)
 François Topino-Lebrun (1764–1801)
 Victor Tortez (1843-1890)
 Édouard Toudouze (1848–1907) 
 Henri de Toulouse-Lautrec (1864–1901)
 Anthelme Trimolet (1798–1866)
 Constant Troyon (1810–1865)
 Marie-Renée Ucciani (1883-1963)
 Maurice Utrillo (1883–1955)
 Suzanne Valadon (1865–1938)
 Pierre Adolphe Valette (1876–1942)
 Aimé Venel (born 1950)
 Louis Mathieu Verdilhan (1875–1928)
 Claude Joseph Vernet (1714–1789)
 Horace Vernet (1789–1863)
 Bernard Vidal (born 1944)
 Élisabeth Vigée-Lebrun (1755–1842)
 Victor Vignon (1847–1909)
 Jean-Marie Villard (1828–1899)
 Marie-Denise Villers (1774–1821)
 Jacques Villon (1875–1963)
 Henri Vincent-Anglade (1876–1956)
 André-Léon Vivrel (1886–1976)
 Lucien Vogt (1891–1968)
 Simon Vouet (1590–1649)
 Arnaud Courlet de Vregille (born 1958)
 Édouard Vuillard (1868–1940)
 Joseph Wamps (1689–1744)
 Antoine Watteau (1684–1721)
 François Willi Wendt (1909–1970)
 Georges Yatridès (1931–2019)
 Félix Ziem (1821–1911)
 Achille Zo (1826–1901)

By century

15th century 

 Robert Campin (1378–1445)
 Jean Fouquet (1425–1481)

16th century 

 Jean Clouet (1480–1541)
 Corneille de Lyon (1500–1575)
 Jean Cousin the Elder (1500–c. 1593)
 François Clouet (1515–1572)
 Jean Cousin the Younger (c. 1522–1595)

17th century 

 Simon Vouet (1590–1649)
 Louis Le Nain (1593–1648)
 Nicolas Poussin (1594–1665)
 Jacques Stella (1596–1657)
 Jacques Linard (1597–1645)
 Sebastian Stoskopff (1597–1657)
 Le Nain brothers (c.1599–1677)
 Philippe de Champaigne (1602–1674)
 Jean Nicolle (1610–c.1650)
 Pierre Mignard (1612–1695)
 Daniel Hallé (1614–1675)
 Pierre Le Tellier (1614–1702)
 Marc Restout (1616–1684)
 Eustache Lesueur (1617–1655)
 Charles Le Brun (1619–1690)
 Jean-Baptiste de Champaigne (1631–1681)
 Jean Chardin (1643–1713)
 Jean Jouvenet (1644–1717)
 François de Troy (1645–1730)
 Nicolas Colombel (1646–1717)
 Jacques Restout (1650–1701)
 Claude Guy Hallé (1652–1736)
 Eustache Restout (1655–1743)
 Louis de Boullogne (1657–1733)

18th century 

 Nicolas Bertin (1667–1736)
 Thomas Restout (1671–1754)
 Antoine Watteau (1684–1721)
 Jean-Baptiste Oudry (1686–1755)
 Nicolas Lancret (1690–1743)
 Jean Siméon Chardin (1699–1779)
 Étienne Jeaurat (1699–1789)
 Joseph Aved (1702–1766)
 François Boucher (1703–1770)
 Maurice Quentin de La Tour (1704–1788)
 Louis Michel van Loo (1707–1771)
 Jérôme-François Chantereau (1710?–?)
 Noël Hallé (1711–1781)
 Charles-Louis Clérisseau (1721-1820)
 Joseph Siffred Duplessis (1725–1802)
 Jean-Baptiste Greuze (1725–1805)
 Michel-Bruno Bellengé (1726–1793)
 Jean-Baptiste-Henri Deshays (1729–1765)
 Jean-Honoré Fragonard (1732–1806)
 Jean Bardin (1732–1809)
 Joseph Ducreux (1735–1802)
 Marie-Geneviève Navarre (1737–1795) 
 Jacques-Louis David (1748–1825)
 Charles Eschard (1748–1810)
 Rosalie Filleul (1752–1794)
 Jean-Baptiste Regnault (1754–1829)
 Élisabeth Vigée-Lebrun (1755–1842)
 François-Léonard Dupont-Watteau (1756–1824)
 Louis-Léopold Boilly (1761–1845)
 Sophie Prieur (active late 18th century)

19th century 

 Zoé Goyet (died 1869)
 Jean-Baptiste Goyet (1779–1854)
 Jean-François Boisard (1762–1820)
 Thomas Henry (1766–1836)
 Marie-Denise Villers (1774–1821)
 Dominique Ingres (1780–1867)
 Johan Stephan Decker (1784–1844)
 Stéphanie de Virieu (1785–1873)
 Charles-Caïus Renoux (1795–1846)
 Xavier Leprince (1799–1826))
 Clara Filleul (1822–1878)
 Théodore Géricault (1791–1824)
 Jean-Baptiste Louis Gros (1793–1870)
 Jean-Baptiste-Camille Corot (1796–1875)
 Eugène Goyet (1798–1857)
 Eugène Delacroix (1798–1863)
 Alexandre-Gabriel Decamps (1803–1860)
 Eugène Lepoittevin (1806–1870)
 Narcisse Virgilio Díaz (1807–1876)
 Jean-Hippolyte Flandrin (1809–1864)
 Théodore Rousseau (1812–1867)
 Ernest Breton (1812–1875)
 Jean-François Millet (1814–1875)
 Antoine Chintreuil (1816–1873)
 Louise Astoud-Trolley (1817–1883)
 Charles-François Daubigny (1817–1878)
 Théodore Chassériau (1819–1856)
 Gustave Courbet (1819–1877)
 Eugène Lavieille (1820–1889)
 Alfred Dehodencq (1822–1882)
 Rosa Bonheur (1822–1899)
 Jean-Baptiste Bertrand (1823–1887)
 Gustave Boulanger (1824–1888)
 Henri-Pierre Picou (1824–1895)
 Eugène Boudin (1824–1898)
 Pierre Puvis de Chavannes (1824–1898)
 William Bouguereau (1825–1905)
 Achille Zo (1826–1901)
 Gustave Moreau (1826–1898)
 Jules-Élie Delaunay (1828–1891)
 Camille Pissarro (1830–1903)
 Édouard Manet (1832–1883)
 Leon Bonnat (1833–1922)
 Louis Émile Benassit (1833–1902)
 Edgar Degas (1834–1917)
 Jean-Paul Laurens (1838–1921)
 Paul Cézanne (1839–1906)
 Claude Monet (1840–1926)
 Auguste Renoir (1841–1919)
 Frédéric Bazille (1841–1870)
 Berthe Morisot (1841–1895)
 Armand Guillaumin (1841–1927)
 Victor Tortez (1843–1890)
 Henri Rousseau (1844–1910)
 Gustave Caillebotte (1848–1894)
 Paul Gauguin (1848–1903)
 Gabriel Guay (1848–1923)
 Gaston Anglade (1854–1919)
 Charles Angrand (1854–1926)
 Frédéric Samuel Cordey (1854–1911)
 Hippolyte Petitjean (1854–1929)
 Jules Monge (1855–1934)
 Henri Pinta (1856–1944)
 Auguste Prévot-Valéri (1857–1830)
 Georges Seurat (1859–1891)
 Charles-Amable Lenoir (1860–1926)

20th century 

 Jean-François Batut (1828–1907)
 Paul Marny (1829–1914)
 Alexandre Rachmiel (1835–1918)
 Narcisse Chaillou (1835–1916)
 Andrée Belle (1840–1901)
 Franz Schrader (1844–1924)
 Alfred-Arthur Brunel de Neuville (1852–1941)
 Charles-Fernand de Condamy (1855–1913)
 Jules Monge (1855–1934)
 Henri-Julien Dumont (1859–1921)
 Maurice Moisset (1860–1946)
 Aristide Maillol (1861–1944)
 Albert Joseph Pénot (1862–1930)
 Paul Signac (1863–1935)
 Henri de Toulouse-Lautrec (1864–1901)
 Charles Léon Godeby (1866–1952)
 André Devambez (1867–1944)
 Pierre Bonnard (1867–1947)
 Édouard Vuillard (1868–1940)
 Alfred Swieykowski (1869–1953)
 Henri Matisse (1869–1954)
 Henri Royer (1869–1938)
 Clément Castelli (1870–1959)
 Georges Dufrénoy (1870–1943)
 Maurice Denis (1870–1943)
 Tancrède Synave (1870–1936)
 Georges Rouault (1871–1958)
 Léon Printemps (1871–1945)
 Henry d'Estienne (1872–1949)
 Alfred Lesbros (1873–1940)
 Joseph de La Nézière (1873–1944)
 Louis Mathieu Verdilhan (1875–1928)
 Joseph Crepin (1875–1948)
 Henri Malançon (1876–1960)
 Henri Vincent-Anglade (1876–1956)
 Marguerite Delorme (1876–1946)
 Jean Puy (1876–1960)
 René Charles Edmond His (1877–1960)
 Henri Marret (1878–1964)
 Edmond-Édouard Lapeyre (1880–1960)
 Vincent Manago (1880–1936)
 Fernand Léger (1881–1955)
 Georges Barrière (1881–1944)
 Pierre Bodard (1881–1937)
 Georges Braque (1882–1963)
 Maurice Utrillo (1883–1955)
 Émile Colinus (1884–1966)
 André Beronneau (1886–1973)
 André-Léon Vivrel (1886–1976)
 Jacques Majorelle (1886–1962)
 Jean Rouppert (1887–1979)
 Alfred Latour (1888–1964)
 Paul Sibra (1889–1951)
 André Prévot-Valéri (1890–1959)
 Lucien Vogt (1891–1968)
 René Fontayne (1891–1952)
 Boris O'Klein (1893–1985)
 Roger de la Corbière (1893–1974)
 Maurice Savin (1894–1973)
 André Maire (1898–1984)
 Fernand Dauchot (1898–1982)
 Zareh Moskofian (1898–1987)
 Jean Cocteau (1899–1963)
 Louis Bissinger (1899–1978)
 Raymond Besse (1899–1969)
 Jean Dubuffet (1901–1985)
 Marcelle Bergerol (1901–1989)
 Pierre Bobot (1902-1974)
 Jean Bazaine (1904–2001)
 Henri Cadiou (1906–1989)
 Raymond Rochette (1906–1993)
 Camille Bryen (1907–1977)
 Édouard Delaporte (1909–1983)
 François Willi Wendt (1909–1970)
 Rex Barrat (1914–1974)
 Gerard Locardi (1915–1998)
 José Charlet (1916–1993)
 Andrée Le Coultre (1917–1986)
 Maurice Boitel (1919–2007)
 Renée Aspe (1922–1969)
 François Brochet (1925–2001)
 I.J. Berthe Hess (1925–1996)
 Arcabas (1926–2018)
 Bernard Rosenblum (1927–2007)
 T'ang Haywen (1927–1991)
 Alvaro Guillot (1931–2010)
 Georges Yatridès (1931–2019)
 Virgilije Nevjestić (1935–2009)
 Henri Sert (1938–1964)
 Yehiel Rabinowitz (born 1939)
 Ksenia Milicevic (born 1942)
 Bernard Vidal (1944–2019)
 Henri de Jordan (1944–1996)
 Jacques Pellegrin (born 1944)
 Claude Plessier (born 1946)
 Monique de Roux (born 1946)
 Victor Koulbak (born 1946)
 Ahmed Hajeri (born 1948)
 Bracha L. Ettinger (born 1948)
 Aimé Venel (born 1950)
 Karen Joubert Cordier (born 1954)
 Jean Paul Leon (born 1955)
 Pierre Lamalattie (born 1956)
 Denis Prieur (born 1957)
 Michel Suret-Canale (born 1957)
 Arnaud Courlet de Vregille (born 1958)
 Nicola Rosini Di Santi (born 1959)
 Wang Yan Cheng (born 1960)
 François Mathieu (1962–2007)
 Jean Fernand (born 1948)
 Philippe Richard (born 1962)
 Philippe Calandre (born 1964)
 Jeff Roland (born 1969)
 Olivier Masmonteil (born 1973)
 Sotiris René Sidiropoulos (born 1977)
 Amar Ben Belgacem (1979–2010)
 Théo Mercier (born 1984)
 Seb Toussaint (born 1988)

See also 

 :Category:French painters
 List of French artists – including all visual and plastic arts
 List of French engravers

References

Painters
French